Baluchabad may refer to:
 Baluchabad, Aliabad, Golestan Province
 Baluchabad, Galikash, Golestan Province
 Baluchabad, Gorgan, Golestan Province
 Baluchabad, Ramian, Golestan Province
 Baluchabad-e Gardayesh, Golestan Province
 Baluchabad-e Mashu, Golestan Province
 Baluchabad, Kerman
 Baluchabad, Faryab, Kerman Province
 Baluchabad, Sistan and Baluchestan
 Baluchabad-e Kahnaki, Sistan and Baluchestan Province